Sarsu may refer to:
 Sarsu, Baneh
 Sarsu Bala, Sanandaj County
 Sarsu Pain, Sanandaj County